Tarnak may refer to:
Tarnak River, Afghanistan
Tarnak Aw Jaldak District, Afghanistan
Tarnak Farms, Afghanistan